Nemophora prodigellus is a moth of the Adelidae family. It is found in most of Europe, except Ireland, Great Britain, the Benelux, Portugal, most of the Balkan Peninsula, the Baltic region and Fennoscandia.

The larvae feed on Stachys officinalis.

References

External links
Lepiforum.de
Species info at nkis.info

Moths described in 1853
Adelidae
Moths of Europe
Moths of Asia